Cyperus cearaensis is a species of sedge that is native to north eastern parts of Brazil.

See also 
 List of Cyperus species

References 

cearaensis
Plants described in 1936
Flora of Brazil